The 1992 SCCA American Continental Championship was the first season of the Sports Car Club of America sanctioned professional Formula Continental championship. Greg Ray won the series championship for Primus Racing in a Van Diemen RF92

Race calendar and results

Drivers' Championship

Scoring system

References

U.S. F2000 National Championship seasons
1992 in American motorsport